Josegiri  is a village in the northeastern side of Kannur District in the Indian state of Kerala. The village is bordered by Karnataka  forest area also. Josegiri comes under the Cherupuzha gramapanchayath in Payyannur Taluk. Major source of income is Agriculture. 

Josegiri is well known for its natural beauty and hilltop viewpoint Thirunettikkallu is a hill top in josegiri which attracts lot of tourists to there. .

Schools
 ST. George LP School, Josegiri
 Aanganavadi Nellikanam

Churches 
 ST. Joseph Church, Josegiri
 ST. George Chapel, Naripara
 ST. Jude Chapel, Nellikanam

Nearest Railway Stations
Payyannur Railway station-50;km

Nearest Airport
 Kannur International Airport and Mangalore international Airport ( Karnataka)

Location

References

External links
Ernakulam District website

Villages in Ernakulam district